Alcaligenes cupidus is a bacterium from the genus Alcaligenes which was isolated from seawater.

References

Burkholderiales
Bacteria described in 1972